Texhaya, or  Texja, is a former Salinan settlement in Monterey County, California. It was located near the site of San Antonio Mission; its precise location is unknown.

References

Former settlements in Monterey County, California
Former Native American populated places in California
Salinan populated places
Lost Native American populated places in the United States